Bradley Stephen Lethbridge (born 22 December 2000) is an English  footballer who plays for Bognor Regis Town as a forward.

Club career

Portsmouth
Lethbridge first joined Portsmouth as a central midfielder at the age of 10 but was released after just one year. In 2014 he returned to Pompey as a striker and signed apprenticeship terms with the club in 2017. In December 2017, Lethbridge was an unused sub in a Checkatrade Trophy match versus Northampton Town.

In July 2018, Lethbridge joined Isthmian League side Bognor Regis Town on loan.

On 13 November 2018, Lethbridge made his Portsmouth debut starting in a 3-2 Checkatrade Trophy win versus Tottenham Hotspur U21s.

On 30 April 2019, Lethbridge was offered a third year scholarship with Portsmouth. He scored his first goal for Portsmouth in an EFL Trophy tie against Oxford United on 8 October 2019.

On 12 May 2020, Lethbridge announced he would be released by Pompey at the end of his contract.

Bognor Regis Town

After his release Lethbridge signed for Bognor Regis Town permanently.

Career statistics

References

External links
Portsmouth FC profile

2000 births
Living people
Association football defenders
Bognor Regis Town F.C. players
English footballers
Isthmian League players
Portsmouth F.C. players